Piatã is a municipality in the state of Bahia in Brazil. The population is 16,984 (2020 est.) in an area of 1825.86 km2. The elevation is 1,268 m.

References

External links
http://www.citybrazil.com.br/ba/piata/

Municipalities in Bahia